Gabriel Rafael Mendoza Ibarra (born 22 May 1968 in Graneros), commonly known as Coca Mendoza for his  similarity with the television actress Coca Guazzini, is a former Chilean footballer that played in the position of right back and central midfielder.

Mendoza was member of Colo-Colo's historic squad that achieved 1991 Copa Libertadores.

Biography

Playing career
Mendoza arrived to Colo-Colo, after of made a recognized season with O'Higgins. In the Cacique, he immediately was won the position of right back in the squad of the coach Mirko Jozic, European style assiduously defensive, but with very vertigo in the sidebands.

He was one of key players of the club in the squad that Colo-Colo achieved the Copa Libertadores 1991, after of defeat to Olimpia for 3–0 in the final, however he also was included in the best team of South America. Mendoza also won the Chilean Primera Division with the club in the same year. In the match against Puebla for Recopa Sudamericana of 1992, he scored one of three goals of Colo-Colo, in the 3–1 victory. After of four good seasons, he was signed by Tigres UANL of Mexico.

After of made an irregular season with Tigres, he return to Chile, for play at Santiago Wanderers in 2000. One year later, he returned to Colo-Colo. After of his spent for Colo-Colo, he joined to Shandong Luneng of Chinese Super League. He had gone to China along with Ricardo Queraltó, but he just could sign with the club. Finally in 2002, he return to Chile for finish his career at Santiago Morning.

Post-playing career
In 2005, Gabriel Mendoza participated in the reality show La Granja VIP. During the reality, he was the runner-up of the contest, after of loss in a mourning of force at final against the Spanish singer Javier Estrada. After of his participation in this reality, he was invited to many stellars of the Chilean TV. In 2009, Mendoza once appeared in a TV serie, the reality show 1810 of Canal 13. He had his personal revenge, because he won the final of the reality, winning a reward of 50 million pesos (US$80.000).

Currently Mendoza plays in the Chile national team of Showbol, tournament of futsal played for all South America. He also has a football school in Viña del Mar, called Gabriel "Coca" Mendoza.

In the 2016 Chilean municipal elections, Mendoza was elected as a councilman for Viña del Mar with the Independent Democratic Union, winning 5,314 votes, the most in that city's election.

Honours
Gabriel Mendoza does not exist

References

External links

1968 births
Living people
People from Graneros
Chilean people of Basque descent
Chilean footballers
Chilean expatriate footballers
Chile international footballers
Association football defenders
Tigres UANL footballers
Shandong Taishan F.C. players
São Paulo FC players
Colo-Colo footballers
Santiago Morning footballers
O'Higgins F.C. footballers
Santiago Wanderers footballers
1991 Copa América players
1993 Copa América players
1995 Copa América players
Primera B de Chile players
Chilean Primera División players
Liga MX players
Expatriate footballers in Brazil
Expatriate footballers in China
Expatriate footballers in Mexico
Chilean expatriate sportspeople in Brazil
Chilean expatriate sportspeople in China
Chilean expatriate sportspeople in Mexico
Reality show winners
Reality television participants
Independent Democratic Union politicians
Chilean television personalities